Angga Febryanto Putra (born February 4, 1995) is an Indonesian footballer who plays as a forward.

Club career

Persib Bandung
He made his professional debut in the Liga 1 on April 22, 2017 against PS TNI.

International career
In 2010, Angga represented the Indonesia U-16, in the 2010 AFC U-16 Championship.

References

External links
 Angga Febryanto at Liga-Indonesia
 Angga Febryanto at Soccerway

Living people
1995 births
Association football forwards
Indonesian footballers
Liga 1 (Indonesia) players
Sportspeople from Surabaya
Persib Bandung players